Megadytes glaucus  is a species of beetles of the family Dytiscidae.

Description
The basic color of the body is dark shiny. These beetles have oval, flattened streamlined bodies adapted for aquatic life. As they live in water, they have to surface for air and carry a bubble of air under their elytra. The hindlegs are adapted for propelling this insect in the water.

Distribution
This species can be found in Argentina, Uruguay and Chile.

References
 ITIS Report
 Universal Biological Indexer
 Synopsis of the described Coleoptera of the World
 Dytiscidae de Argentina
 Dytiscidae de Chile
 Nilsson, A. N. - World Catalogue of Dytiscidae - Corrections and additions, 2 (Coleoptera: Dytiscidae) - Koleopterologische Rundschau, vol. 74

Dytiscidae
Beetles described in 1837